Back to Mine: Röyksopp is a compilation album from the Back to Mine series from DMC Publishing. It was compiled and mixed by the Norwegian electronica band, Röyksopp. Album cover art was by artist Tommy Penton.

Reception

Allmusic rated the compilation album four and a half out of five stars.

Track listing

Charts

References

Röyksopp albums
Royksopp
2007 compilation albums